Route 107 is a north/south highway on the north shore of the Saint Lawrence River. Its southern terminus is in Maniwaki at the junction of Route 105 and its northern terminus is in Grand-Remous at the junction of Route 117.

Municipalities along Route 107

 Maniwaki
 Déléage
 Aumond
 Grand-Remous

Major intersections

See also
 List of Quebec provincial highways

References

External links  
 Official Transport Quebec Road Map (Courtesy of the Quebec Ministry of Transportation) 
Route 107 on Google Maps

107